Elitsa Kostova was the defending champion, but lost in the first round to Pauline Parmentier.

Top seed Lourdes Domínguez Lino won the title, defeating second seed Sílvia Soler Espinosa in an all-Spanish final, 6–4, 6–3.

Seeds

Main draw

Finals

Top half

Bottom half

References 
 Main draw

Open Montpellier Mediterranee Metropole Herault - Singles